Ado Bayero CFR, LLD, JP (25 July 1930 – 6 June 2014) was the Emir of Kano from 1963 to 2014.

Early life

Lineage 
Ado Bayero was born on 25 July 1930 into the royal family of the Fulani Sullubawa clan that has ruled over the Emirate of Kano since 1819. His father was Abdullahi Bayero and mother Hajiya Hasiya. He was the eleventh child of his father and the second of his mother. At the age of seven, he was sent to live with Maikano Zagi. His father reigned for 27 years. Muhammadu Sanusi I who was Ado Bayero's half brother ruled after their father from 1953 to 1963. Following his dethronement in 1963, Muhammadu Inuwa ascended the throne for three months.

Early life and education 
He started his education in Kano studying Islam, after which he attended Kano Middle School (Rumfa College, Kano). He graduated from the School of Arabic Studies in 1947. He then worked as a bank clerk for the Bank of British West Africa until 1949, when he joined the Kano Native Authority. He attended Zaria Clerical College in 1952. In 1954, he won a seat to the Northern regional House of Assembly.

He was head of the Kano Native Authority police division from 1957 until 1962, during which he tried to minimize the practice of briefly detaining individuals and political opponents on the orders of powerful individuals in Kano. He then became the Nigerian Ambassador to Senegal, during this time he enrolled in a French language class.

Reign

Accession 
After the death of Emir Muhammadu Inuwa who ruled for three months only, Ado Bayero was crowned the Emir of Kano on October 22, 1963, becoming the 13th Fulani Emir of Kano and the 56th ruler of Kano.

1960s 
Bayero became emir during the first republic, at a time when Nigeria was going through rapid social and political changes and regional, sub-regional and ethnic discord was increasing. In his first few years, two pro-Kano political movements gained support among some Kano elites. The Kano People's Party emerged during the reign of Muhammadu Inuwa and supported the deposed Emir Sanusi, but it soon evaporated. The Kano State Movement emerged towards the end of 1965 and favored more economic autonomy for the province. 

The death in 1966 of many political agitators from northern Nigeria, and the subsequent establishment of a unitary state, consolidated a united front in the northern region but also resulted in a spate of violence there, including in Kano. Bayero's admirers credit him with bringing calm and stability during this and later crises in Kano.

1970s 
The constitutional powers of the emir were whittled down by the military regimes between 1966 and 1979. The Native Authority Police and Prisons Department was abolished, the emir's judicial council was superseded by another body, and local government reforms in 1968, 1972, and 1976 reduced the powers of the emir.

1980s 
During the second republic, he witnessed hostilities from the People's Redemption Party led government of Abubakar Rimi. Bayero's Palace plays host to official visits by many government personnel and foreigners, but in 1981 Governor Abubakar Rimi restricted traditional homage paid by village heads to Ado Bayero and excised some domains from his emirate.

In 1984, a travel ban was placed on the emir and his friend Okunade Sijuwade. Although the military are sometimes seen as relying on traditional rulers for support, many military regimes in the past reduced the powers of traditional rulers such as Bayero.

Later years
As emir, he became a patron of Islamic scholarship and embraced Western education as a means to succeed in a modern Nigeria. He was a vocal critic of the terrorist group Boko Haram and strongly opposed their campaign against western education. On 19 January 2013, he survived an assassination attempt blamed on the Islamist group which left two of his sons injured and his driver and bodyguard dead, among others. A prime suspect confessed to have participated in the attack on the Emir's motorcade and so many other co-ordinated attacks in the state which led to the arrest of six others.

Death and succession 
On 6 June 2014, after fifty-one years on the throne, Ado Bayero died in his palace Gidan Rumfa. A bitter succession struggle over who'd succeed him emerged within the royal family between the Bayero and Sanusi houses. His eldest son and heir, Sanusi Ado Bayero was considered the natural successor and initial reports announced him as Emir. On 8 June 2014, his grand nephew Sanusi Lamido Sanusi was crowned Emir of Kano. His son, Sanusi Ado in protest decided to leave Kano and in 2015, he was stripped of all his titles, after refusing to pay allegiance to Emir Sanusi Lamido Sanusi.

Legacy 
Bayero was the longest-serving emir in Kano's history. He was seen as one of Nigeria's most prominent and revered Muslim leaders who was a successful businessman and had worked as a banker, police officer, MP and diplomat. Ado Bayero was the 13th Fulani Emir since the Fulani War of Usman dan Fodio, when the Fulani took over the Hausa city-states. He was one of the strongest and most powerful emirs in the history of the Hausa land. He was renowned for his abundant wealth, maintained by means of stock market investments and large-scale agricultural entrepreneurship both at home and abroad.

References

BBC, Nigeria: The Rioting in Kano, The British Broadcasting Corporation, BBC Summary of World Broadcasts, July 13, 1981.
"Alhaji (dr.) Ado Bayero: 40 Years of Service to Humanity", Daily Trust, October 13, 2003.
http://saharareporters.com/news-page/emir-kano-dead

Emirs of Kano
Ambassadors of Nigeria to Senegal
1930 births
2014 deaths
Rumfa College alumni